La Amistad (Spanish for Friendship) was a 19th-century two-masted schooner, owned by a Spaniard colonizing Cuba. It became renowned in July 1839 for a slave revolt by Mende captives, who had been captured and sold to European slave traders, and illegally transported by a Portuguese ship from West Africa to Cuba in violation of existing European treaties against the Atlantic slave trade. Two Spanish plantation owners, Don José Ruiz and Don Pedro Montes, bought 53 captives, including four children, in Havana, Cuba, and were transporting them on the ship to their plantations near Puerto Príncipe (modern Camagüey, Cuba). The revolt began after the schooner's cook jokingly told the slaves that they were to be "killed, salted, and cooked." Sengbe Pieh, a Mende man, also known as Joseph Cinqué, unshackled himself and the others on the third day and started the revolt. They took control of the ship, killing the captain and the cook. In the melee, three Africans were also killed.

Pieh ordered Ruiz and Montes to sail to Africa. Instead, Ruiz and Montes sailed north, up the east coast of the United States, sure that the ship would be intercepted and the Africans returned to Cuba as slaves. A US ship, the revenue cutter Washington, seized Amistad off Montauk Point on Long Island, New York. Pieh and his group escaped the ship but were caught offshore by citizens. They were incarcerated in New Haven, Connecticut, on charges of murder and piracy. The man who captured Pieh and his group claimed them as property. La Amistad was towed to New London, Connecticut, and those remaining on the ship were arrested. None of the 43 survivors on the ship spoke English, so they could not explain what had taken place. Eventually, language professor Josiah Gibbs found an interpreter, James Covey, and learned of the abduction.

Two lawsuits were filed. The first case was brought by the Washington ship officers over property claims and the second case was the Spanish being charged with enslaving Africans. Spain requested President Martin Van Buren to return the African captives to Cuba under international treaty.

Because of issues of ownership and jurisdiction, the case gained international attention. Known as United States v. The Amistad (1841), the case was finally decided by the Supreme Court of the United States in favor of the Mende, restoring their freedom. It became a symbol in the United States in the movement to abolish slavery.

Description
In 1839 it was owned by Ramón Ferrer, a Spanish national. Strictly speaking, La Amistad was not a typical slave ship, as it was not designed like others to traffic massive numbers of enslaved Africans, nor did it engage in the Middle Passage of Africans to the Americas. The ship engaged in the shorter, domestic coastwise trade around Cuba and islands and coastal nations in the Caribbean. The primary cargo carried by La Amistad was sugar-industry products. It carried a limited number of passengers and enslaved Africans being trafficked for delivery or sale around the island.

History

1839 slave revolt

Captained by Ferrer, La Amistad left Havana on June 28, 1839, for the small port of Guanaja, near Puerto Príncipe, Cuba, with some general cargo and 53 African slaves bound for the sugar plantation where they were to be delivered. These 53 Mende captives (49 adults and four children) had been captured by African slave catchers or otherwise enslaved in Mendiland (in modern-day Sierra Leone), sold to European slave traders and illegally transported from Africa to Havana, mostly aboard the Portuguese slave ship Teçora, to be sold in Cuba. Although the United States and Britain had banned the Atlantic slave trade, Spain had not abolished slavery in its colonies. The crew of La Amistad, lacking purpose-built slave quarters, placed half the captives in the main hold and the other half on deck. The captives were relatively free to move about, which aided their revolt and commandeering of the vessel. In the main hold below decks, the captives found a rusty file and sawed through their manacles.

On about July 1, once free, the men below quickly went up on deck. Armed with machete-like cane knives, they attacked the crew, successfully gaining control of the ship, under the leadership of Sengbe Pieh (later known in the United States as Joseph Cinqué). They killed the captain and some of the crew, but spared José Ruiz and Pedro Montes, the two owners of the slaves, so that they could guide the ship back to Africa. While the Mende demanded to be returned home, the navigator Montes deceived them about the course, maneuvering the ship north along the North American coast until they reached the eastern tip of Long Island, New York.

Several New York pilot boats came across Amistad as on 21 August 1839, when she was discovered thirty miles southeast of Sandy Hook by the pilot-boat Blossom who supplied the men with water and bread. When they attempted to board the pilot-boat to escape, the pilot-boat cut the rope that was attached to the Amistad. The pilots then communicated what they felt was a Slave ship to the Collector of the Port of New York.  Two days later, the Gratitude pilot boat came across the La Amistad when she was twenty-five miles east of Fire Island. When Captain Seaman of the Gratitude wanted to put a pilot aboard, one of the ringleaders of the La Amistad  ordered the men to fire on the Gratitude. Gun shots hit the pilot boat but she was able to escape.

Discovered by the naval brig  while on surveying duties, La Amistad was taken into United States custody.

Court case
The Washington officers brought the first case to federal district court over salvage claims while the second case began in a Connecticut court after the state arrested the Spanish traders on charges of enslaving free Africans. The Spanish foreign minister, however, demanded that Amistad and its cargo be released from custody and the "slaves" sent to Cuba for punishment by Spanish authorities. While the Van Buren administration accepted the Spanish crown's argument, Secretary of State John Forsyth explained that the president could not order the release of Amistad and its cargo because the executive could not interfere with the judiciary under American law. He could also not release the Spanish traders from imprisonment in Connecticut because that would constitute federal intervention in a matter of state jurisdiction. Abolitionists Joshua Leavitt, Lewis Tappan, and Simeon Jocelyn formed the Amistad Committee to raise funds for the defense of Amistad'''s captives. Former President John Quincy Adams represented the captives in court.

A widely publicized court case ensued in New Haven to settle legal issues about the ship and the status of the Mende captives. They were at risk of execution if convicted of mutiny. They became a popular cause among abolitionists in the United States. Since 1808, the United States and Britain had prohibited the international slave trade. In order to avoid the international prohibition on the African slave trade, the ship's owners fraudulently described the Mende as having been born in Cuba and said they were being sold in the Spanish domestic slave trade. The court had to determine if the Mende were to be considered salvage and thus the property of naval officers who had taken custody of the ship (as was legal in such cases), the property of the Cuban buyers, or the property of Spain, as Queen Isabella II claimed, via Spanish ownership of the Amistad. A question was whether the circumstances of the capture and transport of the Mende meant they were legally free and had acted as free men rather than slaves.

After judges ruled in favor of the Africans in the district and circuit courts, the United States v. The Amistad case reached the US Supreme Court on appeal. In 1841, it ruled that the Mende had been illegally transported and held as slaves, and had rebelled in self-defense. It ordered them freed. Although the US government did not provide any aid, thirty-five survivors returned to Africa in 1842, aided by funds raised by the United Missionary Society, a black group founded by James W.C. Pennington. He was a Congregational minister and fugitive slave in Brooklyn, New York, who was active in the abolitionist movement. The Spanish government claimed that the slaves were Spanish citizens not of African origin. This created a lot of tension between the U.S. government, the Spanish crown, and the British government, which had outlawed the slave trade in the British Empire with the Slave Trade Act of 1807 and had recently abolished slavery in the British Empire with the Slavery Abolition Act of 1833.

Later years
After being moored at the wharf behind the US Custom House in New London, Connecticut, for a year and a half, La Amistad was auctioned off by the U.S. Marshal in October 1840. Captain George Hawford, of Newport, Rhode Island, purchased the vessel and then needed an Act of Congress passed to register it. He renamed it Ion. In late 1841, he sailed Ion to Bermuda and Saint Thomas with a typical New England cargo of onions, apples, live poultry, and cheese.

After sailing Ion for a few years, Hawford sold it in Guadeloupe in 1844. There is no record of what became of Ion under the new French owners in the Caribbean.

Legacy

The Amistad Memorial stands in front of New Haven City Hall and County Courthouse in New Haven, Connecticut, where many of the events related to the affair in the United States occurred.

The Amistad Research Center at Tulane University, New Orleans, Louisiana, is devoted to research about slavery, abolition, civil rights and African Americans; it commemorates the revolt of slaves on the ship by the same name. A collection of portraits of La Amistad survivors that were drawn by William H. Townsend during the survivors' trial are held in the collection of Yale University.

Replica
Between 1998 and 2000, artisans at Mystic Seaport, Mystic, Connecticut, built a replica of La Amistad, using traditional skills and construction techniques common to wooden schooners built in the 19th century, but using modern materials and engines. Officially named Amistad, it was promoted as "Freedom Schooner Amistad". The modern-day ship is not an exact replica of La Amistad, as it is slightly longer and has higher freeboard. There were no old blueprints of the original.

The new schooner was built using a general knowledge of the Baltimore Clippers and art drawings from the era. Some of the tools used in the project were the same as those that might have been used by a 19th-century shipwright, while others were powered. Tri-Coastal Marine, designers of "Freedom Schooner Amistad", used modern computer technology to develop plans for the vessel. Bronze bolts are used as fastenings throughout the ship. Freedom Schooner Amistad has an external ballast keel made of lead and two Caterpillar diesel engines. None of this technology was available to 19th-century builders.

"Freedom Schooner Amistad" was operated by Amistad America, Inc., based in New Haven, Connecticut. The ship's mission was to educate the public on the history of slavery, abolition, discrimination, and civil rights. The homeport is New Haven, where the Amistad trial took place. It has also traveled to port cities for educational opportunities. It was also the State Flagship and Tall ship Ambassador of Connecticut. The ship made several commemorative voyages: one in 2007 to commemorate the 200th anniversary of the abolition of the Atlantic slave trade in Britain (1807) and the United States (1808), and one in 2010 to celebrate the 10th anniversary of its 2000 launching at Mystic Seaport. It undertook a two-year refit at Mystic Seaport from 2010 and was subsequently mainly used for sea training in Maine and film work.

In 2013 Amistad America lost its non-profit organization status after failing to file tax returns for three years and amid concern of the accountability for public funding from the state of Connecticut. The company was later put into liquidation, and in November 2015 a new non-profit, Discovering Amistad Inc., purchased the ship from the receiver. Amistad has now been restored to educational and promotional activity in New Haven, Connecticut.

 In popular culture 

On 2 September 1839, a play entitled The Long, Low Black Schooner, based on the revolt, opened in New York City and played to full houses. (La Amistad was painted black at the time of the revolt.)
The slave revolt aboard the La Amistad, the background of the slave trade, and its subsequent trial are retold in a celebrated poem by Robert Hayden entitled "Middle Passage", first published in 1962.
 In Robert Skimin's novel Gray Victory (1988), depicting an alternate history in which the South won the American Civil War, a group of abolitionist conspirators infiltrating Richmond, Virginia calls itself "Amistad".
The film Amistad (1997), directed by Steven Spielberg, dramatized the historical incidents. Major actors were Morgan Freeman, as a freed slave-turned-abolitionist in New Haven; Anthony Hopkins, as John Quincy Adams; Matthew McConaughey, as Roger Sherman Baldwin, an unorthodox, but influential lawyer; and Djimon Hounsou, as Cinque (Sengbe Peah).
The opera Amistad (1997), composed by Anthony Davis with libretto by Thulani Davis, was commissioned and premiered by Lyric Opera of Chicago in 1997. The opera underwent a major revision and was then presented at the Spoleto Festival USA in 2008.
 The 1999 hit single "My Love Is Your Love", performed by Whitney Houston, references the "chains of Amistad".
In January 2011, Random House published Ardency, a collection of poems written over 20 years by American poet Kevin Young which "gathers here a chorus of voices that tells the story of the Africans who mutinied on board the slave ship Amistad''".

See also
African Slave Trade Patrol
Bibliography of early American naval history
Blockade of Africa
Creole case
John Quincy Adams and abolitionism
List of historical schooners
List of ships captured in the 19th century

References

Further reading

External links

Amistad: Seeking Freedom in Connecticut, a National Park Service Discover Our Shared Heritage Travel Itinerary
Sarah Margru Kinson, the Two Worlds of an Amistad Captive
Freedom Schooner Amistad sailing, YouTube video
The Amistad Affair
The current owners of the replica Amistad
“Amistad Connecticut: A Legacy Reborn,” 1998-02-27, The Walter J. Brown Media Archives & Peabody Awards Collection at the University of Georgia, American Archive of Public Broadcasting

 
1839 in the United States
Schooners
Slave rebellions in the United States
Replica ships
Two-masted ships
Museum ships in Connecticut
Slave ships
Museums in New Haven, Connecticut
Captured ships
Maritime incidents in July 1839
Maritime incidents involving slave ships
Fugitive American slaves
American rebel slaves
Abolitionism in the United States
Post-1808 importation of slaves to the United States